Kenia Guadalupe Flores Osuna (born July 15, 1999), known professionally as Kenia Os, is a Mexican singer-songwriter.

Biography
Os started her career as a YouTube personality, she used to upload video blogs regularly, as of May 2022, has over 7.22 million subscribers and over 282 million total views. She uploaded her first video in 2015, joined a larger team of YouTubers, and in May 2018, Os resumed her career independently.

In August 2018 Os signed with label "Lizos Music" and released her debut single, "Por Siempre". After two years under this label, she began releasing music independently. A few months later, she signed with Sony Music Mexico and released her first studio album Cambios de Luna (2022) She has had appearances on streaming platform shows such as HBO Max's Bake Off Celebrity: Mexico, in which she was a contestant on the show, sharing the screen with celebrities such as Yuri, Lorena Herrera and Omar Fierro. Also, in 2021 she hosted the MTV Millennial Awards with Kali Uchis.

Discography

	
 Cambios de Luna (2022)
 K23 (2022)

Filmography

Television

Web

Tours
Kenia Os Tour (2022)
K23 Tour (2023)

Awards and nominations

Notes

External links

References

Latin pop singers
People from Mazatlán
1999 births
Living people
21st-century Mexican women singers
Sony Music Mexico artists
MTV Europe Music Award winners